Ron Sexsmith is the second album and major-label debut album by Canadian singer-songwriter Ron Sexsmith, released in 1995 on Interscope Records. The album's liner notes feature a dedication to Harry Nilsson. "Secret Heart" appeared in the The X Files episode Babylon.

Track listing

Personnel
Ron Sexsmith - vocals, guitar, backing vocals; piano, bass and drums on "There's a Rhythm"
Jerry Scheff - bass
Mitchell Froom - keyboards
Jerry Marotta - drums, percussion, backing vocals
with:
Steve Amedee - tambourine on "Words We Never Use" and "Heart With No Companion"
Martin Tillman - cello on "Speaking With the Angel" and "Several Miles"
Tchad Blake - effects on "From a Few Streets Over"
Daniel Lanois - electric guitar on "There's a Rhythm"
Pierre Marchand - accordion on "There's a Rhythm"
Technical
Tchad Blake - recording, mixing
John Paterno - additional recording
Daniel Lanois - producer on "There's a Rhythm", photography

References

External links
Ron Sexsmith official page album page (includes lyrics)
[ Allmusic album main page]
MP3.com album main page

1995 albums
Ron Sexsmith albums
Albums produced by Mitchell Froom
Interscope Records albums